is a former Japanese football player.

Playing career
Kitani was born in Kamagaya on October 9, 1978. After graduating from Kokushikan University, he joined J2 League club Omiya Ardija in 2001. Although he debuted in first season, he could hardly play in the match until summer 2003. He played many matches as defensive midfielder and center back from summer 2003. However his opportunity to play decreased in 2004. Although Ardija won the 2nd place and was promoted to J1 League from 2005, he left the club end of 2004 season without playing J1.

In 2005, Kitani signed with J2 club Vegalta Sendai. He became a regular player as center back soon and played many matches until 2008. However he could hardly play in the match behind Kodai Watanabe and Elizeu in 2009. Although Vegalta won the champions and was promoted to J1 from 2010, he left the club end of 2009 season without playing J1 again.

In 2010, Kitani signed with J2 club Sagan Tosu. He became a regular player soon. In 2011, he played all 38 matches and Sagan won the 2nd place and was promoted to J1. Although he played in J1 first time in his career in 2012, he lost his position and could only play 4 matches in late in 2012 season.

In July 2013, Kitani moved to J2 club FC Gifu. He played all 17 matches in 2013 season. Although he played many matches in 2014, he retired end of 2014 season.

Club statistics

References

External links

1978 births
Living people
People from Kamagaya
Kokushikan University alumni
Association football people from Chiba Prefecture
Japanese footballers
J1 League players
J2 League players
Omiya Ardija players
Vegalta Sendai players
Sagan Tosu players
FC Gifu players
Association football defenders